The 1931 Albanian National Championship was the second edition of the Albanian National Championship, the top professional league for association football clubs.

Teams

Team locations

Overview
It was contested by 7 teams. The tournament ran from April 19 to July 5, 1931. SK Tirana won the championship. For the 1931 season the league was divided into two groups, Group A consisted of SK Tirana, Bashkimi Shkodran from Shkodër and Sportklub Vlora from Vlorë. Group B consisted of Teuta from Durrës, Skënderbeu from Korçë, SK Elbasani and SK Muzaka from Berat. Urani changed their name to SK Elbasani for this season.

Regular season

Group A

Group B

 Note: 'Bashkimi Shkodran' is the previous name for Vllaznia, 'Sportklub Vlora' is the previous name for Flamurtari and 'SK Muzaka' is the previous name for Tomori

Championship final
SK Tirana 1-1 Teuta
Teuta 0-3 SK Tirana

Top Goal Scorer
 Aristotel Samsuri - Skënderbeu - 9 goals

Winning Squad of SK Tirana

Trainer: Selman Stermasi

References

Unofficial Site of Albanian Football (Giovanni Armillotta)
Albania - List of final tables from RSSSF website

Kategoria Superiore seasons
1
Albania
Albania